Bruges-Capbis-Mifaget is a commune in the Pyrénées-Atlantiques department in southwestern France.

People from the commune are called "brugeois"'.

Geography 

Location  

Road Access  
Bruges-Capbis-Mifaget is accessible by departmental routes 35, 232, 287, and 335.

Bordering communes 

 Haut-de-Bosdarros to the north
 Arros-de-Nay to the northeast
 Lys to the northwest
 Asson to the south and east
 Arthez-d'Asson to the southeast
 Louvie-Juzon to the southwest

See also
Communes of the Pyrénées-Atlantiques department

References

Communes of Pyrénées-Atlantiques
Pyrénées-Atlantiques communes articles needing translation from French Wikipedia